Brasserie Lipp is a brasserie located at 151 Boulevard Saint-Germain in the 6th arrondissement of Paris. It sponsors an annual literary prize, the Prix Cazes, named for a previous owner.

History
On , Léonard Lipp and his wife Pétronille opened the brasserie on the Boulevard Saint-Germain. Their speciality was a cervelat rémoulade starter, then choucroute garnie, served with the finest beers. The brasserie's atmosphere and its modest prices made it a great success. Anti-German sentiment during the First World War led to a change of name to Brasserie des Bords for several years. Of Alsatian origin, Lipp left Alsace when it became part of Germany.

In July 1920, the bougnat (Paris immigrant) Marcellin Cazes redesigned the brasserie, which had become frequented by poets such as Paul Verlaine and Guillaume Apollinaire. He decorated it with tiled murals by Léon Fargues, with painted ceilings by Charly Garrey, and purple moleskin seating. In 1955, Cazes passed the baton to his son Roger.

On 29 October 1965, Mehdi Ben Barka, a Moroccan anti-monarchist politician opposed to King Hassan II, was abducted by the Morocco Secret Service in front of the brasserie, probably with the help of the French. The 'Ben Barka Affair' became a political scandal which fundamentally changed France–Morocco relations.

Since 1990, the brasserie has been progressively developed by the Bertrand family of Auvergne, owners of the Angelina tea house, of fast food chain Bert's, and of the Sir Winston pub chain.

Prix Cazes
In 1935, then innkeeper Marcellin Cazes established the Prix Cazes, a literary prize awarded each year to an author who has won no other literary prize. Up to the present day, the prize is advertised by the Lipp.

Recipients

In culture
The writer Pierre Bourgeade (1927–2009) wrote several pieces with the brasserie as the setting:
 
 
  (Supplement in L'Humanité, 4 April 2009. ISSN 0242-6870)
 , a history of the brasserie.
 In Woody Allen's movie Midnight in Paris, Owen Wilson's character Gil mentions Brasserie Lipp in a passing remark.
 Featured prominently in Ernest Hemingway's 1964 memoir A Moveable Feast.

References

External links 

 
  Brasserie Lipp on the ILA-Châteaux website
  Prix Cazes on Prix-littéraires.net

French literary awards
Coffeehouses and cafés in Paris
Buildings and structures in the 6th arrondissement of Paris
Restaurants established in 1880
1880 establishments in France